Pugin most commonly refers to Augustus Welby Northmore Pugin (1812–1852), an English architect and designer.

Members of his family include:

 Augustus Charles Pugin (1768/9–1832), his French-born father, an artist and architectural draughtsman 
 E. W. Pugin (1834–1875),  his eldest son, also an architect
 Peter Paul Pugin (1851–1904), his youngest son, also an architect

Other, unrelated people who share the Pugin surname include:

 Aleksei Pugin (born 1987), Russian football player
 Jacques Pugin (born 1954), Swiss artist-photographer
 Vitali Pugin (born 1978), retired Russian professional football player

See also 
 Pugin & Pugin, the Pugin family's architectural firm